St Stephen's Anglican Church is a heritage-listed Anglican church on Stirling Terrace, Western Australia. The church was one of the earliest significant public buildings constructed in the town then named Newcastle.

It was built by George Henry Hasell, assisted by stonemason Esau Wetherall and a shingle splitter with the surname MacKnoe. On 9 May 1862 Matthew Hale, in his role as Lord Bishop of the Anglican Diocese of Perth, consecrated the church and it opened for services. A separate bell tower made of bush timber was later constructed and this remains on site. The bell was dedicated in December 1910 by Charles Riley, Bishop of Perth. The first minister was Charles Harper. The bell was made by Fred Metters & Co., Perth and donated by Charles Maxwell Lukin.

On 20 June 1915 a memorial service was held at St Stephen's for William Henry (Bill) Strahan who had been killed in the ANZAC action at Gallipoli during World War I. Strahan was the first Toodyay casualty of the war. Widespread grief saw a large attendance (about 195 people) at his funeral—roughly 1/5 of the district's population.

The shingled roof was replaced with corrugated iron in the mid 1940s.

On 18 March 1948 the sanctuary of St Stephen's church was consecrated by Archbishop Robert Moline, as a memorial to Charles Augustus Lee Steere and Roderick Yelverton Lee Steere, who lost their lives in World War II. The extension was designed by architect F.G.B. Hawkins and built by contractor Mr. Hawkins with bricks from the demolished Nunyle Agricultural Hall.

A flooded gum (Eucalyptus rudis), said to be over 400 years old, towers over the church. The trimming of the upper branches of the tree, giving it a somewhat lopsided appearance, was to prevent it striking overhead power lines which have since been run underground. Although the removal of the tree has been threatened in the past by development it is now regarded as an icon with its historical significance well appreciated.

The architectural style of the church could be described as restrained Gothic with its pointed arched window and door surrounds. There are tall lancet windows to the north and south, with buttresses dividing the north and south façades into evenly spaced bays. The highly pitched roof is today covered by corrugated iron.

See also 
 List of Anglican churches in Western Australia
 List of heritage places in the Shire of Toodyay

References

External links

Toodyay
Toodyay
Buildings and structures in Toodyay, Western Australia
Heritage places in Toodyay, Western Australia
Stirling Terrace, Toodyay
Victorian architecture in Western Australia
19th-century Anglican church buildings
19th-century churches in Australia
1861 establishments in Australia
Churches completed in 1862